Little Yirkie Lake is a small, bottle shaped lake in Ontario. It can be found on the north side of highway 28, near its larger counterpart, Big Yirkie Lake. The lake is small, measuring only 100 metres by 475 metres.

Lakes of Ontario